Anita Ellis (née Kert, later Shapiro; April 12, 1920 – October 28, 2015) was a Canadian-born American singer and actress. She famously dubbed Rita Hayworth's songs in Gilda.

Early years
Anita Kert was born in Montreal, Quebec, the eldest of four children born to Orthodox Jewish parents, Harry and Lillian "Libbie" Kert (née Pearson; originally Peretz). She had a younger sister and two younger brothers, one of whom, Lawrence Frederick Kert (1930–1991), became an actor and singer best known for originating the role of Tony in West Side Story. The family moved to Hollywood when she was nine years old. She graduated from Hollywood High School in 1938, and attended the College of Music in Cincinnati, Ohio.

Ellis became a naturalized United States citizen in 1950.

Voice dubbing
Ellis dubbed the singing voices of such actresses as Rita Hayworth (notably in Gilda, 1946), Vera-Ellen and Jeanne Crain. Twenty-eight years after Gilda was released, entertainment writer Rex Reed reminisced in print about Ellis's voice: "I fell in love with Anita Ellis when I was 8 years old ... Only I didn't know she was Anita Ellis, I thought she was Rita Hayworth ... That was the sexiest voice in 1946, and it kept turning people on for years ..."

For her work in Gilda, her role in the film was greatly underplayed and kept secret by the producers, who wanted fans to believe Hayworth was the singer. They went as far as to put Rita Hayworth's name in the credit of the soundtrack instead of Anita Ellis. Hayworth also bore some resentment towards the studio for not allowing her to sing her own parts and the embarrassment it caused when she was asked to sing by fans who thought she was the voice of Gilda. There were claims made that Hayworth had sung the acoustic guitar version of "Put the Blame on Mame" but this was untrue, as Ellis dubbed Hayworth's singing voice in all the film's songs.

Radio
In 1941, she joined WLW in Cincinnati, Ohio, as a singer. Billed as Anita Kurt, she was a regular on Open House (also known as The Ona Munson Show), The New Jack Carson Show, Tommy Riggs and Betty Lou.

Billed as Anita Ellis, she was also a regular on The Charlie McCarthy Show and The Jack Carson Show. She was a regular guest on The Red Skelton Show. (Two sources list Ellis as one of the vocalists on Skelton's show, without the "guest" modifier.)

Personal life
Ellis married U.S. Army Lt. Frank Wilby Ellis Jr. (1916–1957) on January 23, 1943, in Tucson, Arizona. They divorced in 1946. Lt. Ellis was killed in the crash of TB-47B "Stratojet" #50-0076 on December 18, 1957 while serving as pilot. She remarried, to neurologist Dr. Mortimer Fromberg Shapiro, an Icahn School of Medicine at Mount Sinai faculty member on July 31, 1960; the couple remained together until Shapiro's death on June 6, 1995. Both unions were childless.

She "traveled through the wilderness of Africa and the Himalayas, and taught nature studies at the American Museum of Natural History." In the 1950s, Ellis stopped performing while she underwent psychoanalysis. She returned to professional singing with performances in nightclubs and a recording contract with Epic Records. In 1957, columnist Dorothy Kilgallen wrote: "Anita Ellis ... has surprised everyone with her new jazz singer style. She gives her analyst credit for the New Sound."

Ellis had a pilot's license and flew her own plane for pleasure.

Later years and death
A newspaper article in 1979 reported that Ellis had suffered from stage fright for more than 25 years. Ellis described her condition as "not just stage fright. It's more than that. It's really crippling. It's kept me from my own gifts. It just stops me cold. I don't sing."

She eventually ended her career in 1987 due to her stage fright. A widow, she lived in Manhattan and had suffered from Alzheimer's disease since 2000; she died on October 28, 2015, aged 95, from the disease. Mt. Sinai Hospital's department of neurology received a $1 million gift to support strategic priorities from her estate.

Filmography
She performed in the following films:
Dancing Co-Ed (1939)
Babes in Arms (1939)
Forty Little Mothers (1940)
Strike Up the Band (1940)
Gilda (1946)
The Lady from Shanghai (1947)
Dakota Lil (1950)
The Joe Louis Story (1953)
Gentlemen Marry Brunettes (1955)
Pull My Daisy (1959)

References

External links
 Anita Ellis: For the Record TV documentary
 Rita Hayworth "singing" Put the Blame on Mame in Gilda (voice doubling by Anita Ellis)
 Film Reference biography 
 
 
 Life in Legacy - Week of 10/05/2002
 Arts & Entertainment review of Anita Ellis @ Boston.com

1920 births
2015 deaths
Actresses from Montreal
American women aviators
American women singers
Television personalities from New York City
American women television personalities
Canadian emigrants to the United States
Canadian women singers
Deaths from Alzheimer's disease
Deaths from dementia in New York (state)
Jewish American actresses
Jewish American musicians
Jewish Canadian actresses
Jewish Canadian musicians
Naturalized citizens of the United States
People from the Upper East Side
Singers from Montreal
21st-century American Jews
21st-century American women